The Wilson Avenue Line is a public transit line in Brooklyn, New York City, running along Wilson Avenue and Rockaway Avenue between Williamsburg and Canarsie. Originally a streetcar line, it is now the B60 bus route, operated by MTA New York City Bus.

Route description 
The B60 bus route starts at Williamsburg Bridge Plaza near the Marcy Avenue station. After the subway station, buses head north and use a number of streets through the neighborhood, eventually reaching the Morgan Avenue station on the BMT Canarsie Line. Buses then reach Wilson Avenue and run along the street, parallel to the Canarsie Line until it reaches Decatur and Cooper Streets, near the Wilson Avenue station. Then the route heads south down Decatur and Cooper parallel to the B20 bus, until it reaches Broadway, where the route now heads down Rockaway Avenue. South of Brookdale University Hospital and Medical Center, the B60 enters Canarsie and turns onto Rockaway Parkway. At Rockaway Parkway and Glenwood Road is the Rockaway Parkway terminus of the Canarsie Line and a transfer point to several routes, including the B6, B17, B42 and B82. However, like the B17, the B60 does not have its own dedicated loop and northbound buses stop in front of the station entrance, while southbound service stops on Glenwood Rd at the B6 bus stand. At this point, the B60 continues east along the B6 and B82 routes until East 108th Street, where southbound buses loop around the Breukelen Houses, and ends at Williams Avenue and Flatlands Avenue near the Breukelen Park. Northbound service follows the B82 route to Rockaway Parkway and resumes the regular route.

History
The line was built after 1897 by the Nassau Electric Railroad to gain access to Williamsburg and the Williamsburg Bridge into Manhattan. The line began at Canarsie-Rockaway Parkway on the Canarsie Line and ran north and west along Rockaway Parkway, Rockaway Avenue, Cooper Street, Wilson Avenue, Morgan Avenue, Johnson Avenue, and Broadway to the bridge. Later, eastbound traffic from the bridge was rerouted to use the Bushwick Avenue Line (South 4th Street, Meserole Street, and Bushwick Avenue) to the crossing of Bushwick and Johnson Avenues, and westbound Bushwick Avenue cars were moved to the Wilson Avenue Line. Buses were substituted for streetcars on May 27, 1951.

On December 1, 2022, the MTA released a draft redesign of the Brooklyn bus network. As part of the redesign, the B60 would be split in half at Fulton Street. The southern half would keep the B60 designation, and the northern half would take the new B66 designation. At Fulton Street, both routes would run east along Fulton Street to terminate at Broadway Junction. The B60 would use Flatlands Avenue in both directions in Canarsie. Closely spaced stops would also be eliminated.

References

External links

Streetcar lines in Brooklyn
B060
B060